Juhani Veijo Olamo (1940 – 1 September 2010) was a Finnish philatelist who was appointed to the Roll of Distinguished Philatelists in 1997 and was a Fellow of the Royal Philatelic Society London.

He was an expert on the postage stamps of Finland and the revenue stamps of Ecuador. He was the first president of the Revenue Commission of the Fédération Internationale de Philatélie.

Publications
Finish Philatelic Literature, 1979–82. (A bibliography in five parts)
The Finnish Tete-Beches 1865-1885, 1985.
The Revenue Stamps of Ecuador, YLE, Monistuspalvelu, Helsinki, 1994. 
Postal Censorship in Finland 1914-17.
Finnish Postal Cancellations of the two-ring type.

See also
Postage stamps and postal history of Finland

References

External links
A photograph of Juhani Olamo.

1940 births
2010 deaths
Fellows of the Royal Philatelic Society London
Philately of Finland
Philately of Ecuador
Revenue stamps
Signatories to the Roll of Distinguished Philatelists
Finnish philatelists